This is a list of castles in Syria.

Key

List of castles

See also
List of castles
List of Crusader castles

References

Sources 

 
Syria
Castles
Castles
Syria
Castles